The 1984 Livingston Open was a men's tennis tournament played on outdoor hard courts that was part of the 1984 Volvo Grand Prix. It was played at Newark Academy in Livingston, New Jersey in the United States from July 30 through August 6, 1984. First-seeded Johan Kriek won the singles title.

Finals

Singles

 Johan Kriek defeated  Michael Westphal 6–2, 6–4
 It was Kriek's 2nd singles title of the year and the 12th of his career.

Doubles

 Scott Davis /  Ben Testerman defeated  Paul Annacone /  Glenn Michibata 6–4, 6–4
 It was Davis' only title of the year and the 3rd of his career. It was Testerman's only title of the year and the 1st of his career.

References

External links
 ITF tournament edition details

 
Livingston Open
1984 in sports in New Jersey